Rhabdatomis fasseli is a moth in the subfamily Arctiinae. It was described by William D. Field in 1964. It is found in Colombia.

References

Moths described in 1964
Cisthenina